OGC Nice won Division 1 season 1950/1951 of the French Association Football League with 41 points.

Participating teams

 Bordeaux
 Le Havre AC
 RC Lens
 Lille OSC
 Olympique de Marseille
 FC Nancy
 OGC Nice
 Nîmes Olympique
 RC Paris
 Stade de Reims
 Stade Rennais UC
 CO Roubaix-Tourcoing
 AS Saint-Etienne
 FC Sète
 FC Sochaux-Montbéliard
 Stade Français FC
 RC Strasbourg
 Toulouse FC

Final table

Promoted from Division 2, who will play in Division 1 season 1951/1952
 Olympique Lyonnais: Champion of Division 2
 FC Metz: Runner-up

Results

Top goalscorers

OGC Nice Winning Squad 1950-'51

Goal
 Robert Germain

Defence
 Mokhtar Ben Nacef
 Louis Broccolichi
 Mohamed Firoud
 Marcel Gaillard
 Roger Mindonnet
 Hassan M'jid
 Serge Pedini
 Lennart Samuelsson

Midfield
 Yeso Amalfi
 Jean Belver
 Abdelaziz Ben Tifour
 Désiré Carré
 Åke Hjalmarsson
 Léon Rossi

Attack
 Pär Bengtsson
 Antoine Bonifaci
 Jean Courteaux
 François Fassone
 Robert Grange
 Roberto Serone

Management
 Numa Andoire (Coach)

References

 Division 1 season 1950-1951 at pari-et-gagne.com

Ligue 1 seasons
French
1